Abdelatif Noussir ( – born 20 February 1990, in Mohammedia) is a Moroccan footballer who plays for IR Tanger and represented the Morocco under 23 football team. He also played for Morocco at the 2012 Summer Olympics.

Honours 

FUS
CAF Confederation Cup: 2010
Wydad AC
Botola: 2015, 2017, 2019
CAF Super Cup: 2018
CAF Champions League: 2017

See also
Morocco national under-23 football team

References

External links
 
 

Moroccan footballers
Olympic footballers of Morocco
Footballers at the 2012 Summer Olympics
Living people
1990 births
People from Fez, Morocco
Maghreb de Fès players
Fath Union Sport players
Morocco international footballers
2013 Africa Cup of Nations players
Association football fullbacks
Wydad AC players